La Mancellière-sur-Vire is a former commune in the Manche department in Normandy in north-western France. On 1 January 2016, it was merged into the new commune of Bourgvallées. Its population was 520 in 2019.

See also
Communes of the Manche department

References 

Mancellieresurvire